"Doing a Leeds" is an English football phrase which is synonymous with the potentially dire consequences for domestic clubs in financial mismanagement. The phrase arose after the rapid decline of Premier League club Leeds United F.C., who invested heavily in the late 1990s and early 2000s to attain domestic and lucrative European success, which was capped by high profile appearances in the semi-finals of the UEFA Cup and UEFA Champions League. However, in the process, the club built up large debts, and suffered financial meltdown after failing to continue to qualify for the competition, subsequently dropping down two levels of the football pyramid, into the third tier, Football League One.

Since the creation of the Premier League, a total of 24 of its former clubs have been relegated to League One, of which seven fell down further into the fourth tier (Football League Two) and one of these further into the fifth tier (the National League). Because they had never previously experienced relegation to League One or its predecessors, Leeds were the object of careful observation by media and derision by rival fans.

The fall and rise of Leeds United

As champions of the final First Division season, Leeds United were one of the inaugural 22 clubs of the Premier League, the breakaway top division league competition formed in 1992. Leeds had sustained success in the league in late 1990s, and ultimately reached the semi-finals of the 2000–01 Champions League. Their level of spending to do so however had exceeded all other clubs, and the club's debt level rose annually from £9m to £21m, £39m, £82m and peaked at around £119m, much of the money having been spent on transfer fees and players' wages. After the club failed to qualify for the 2002–03 Champions League by only finishing fifth in the Premier League, it had to make drastic savings by selling players as it could no longer sustain the debt repayments, which relied on the ticket sales and television income from the European competition.

At the end of the 2003–04 FA Premier League season, Leeds United were relegated to the Football League Championship. The financial effects continued, and with one game to go in the 2006–07 season, the club voluntarily entered administration, incurring a 10-point league penalty, resulting in relegation to League One, the first time the club had ever been in the third tier of English football. Subsequent breaches of financial rules in the summer nearly resulted in the club being expelled from the Football League altogether (a fate which coincidentally had befallen the club's predecessors, Leeds City), but they were ultimately re-admitted with a 15-point penalty to apply to the 2007–08 season. Despite further appeals, the penalty stood and ultimately cost the club promotion that season. 

At the end of the 2009–10 season, the club was promoted back to the Championship after a final day victory. They would remain in the Championship for a decade until they finally earned a promotion back to the Premier League for the 2020–21 season, under the management of Marcelo Bielsa, having coming close to earning promotion in the 2018–19  season, where the club narrowly missed out on a play-off final spot.

Similar cases

Leeds United's decline was not entirely without historical precedent, as Wolverhampton Wanderers had suffered a similarly high-profile decline in the 1980s, finishing 6th in the First Division and winning the Football League Cup in 1980, before eventually dropping into the Fourth Division by 1986 on the back of three consecutive relegations. Bristol City had become the first league team to suffer three successive relegations when they went down to the Fourth Division in 1982, although their decline was less dramatic than that of Wolves, as they had spent just four seasons in the First Division and not been as successful or spent as much money on players.

However, the decline of Wolverhampton Wanderers was widely seen as the culmination of decades of financial mismanagement rather than an extreme amount of short-term spending as was the case with Leeds. Wolves had paid a national record fee of nearly £1.5million to sign striker Andy Gray from Aston Villa in 1979, while spending an even greater sum of money of rebuilding one side of the ground to create a large all-seater stand, at the same time.

Contemporaneous to Leeds, Luton Town, who were relegated from the Championship alongside them in 2007, suffered an even more severe decline and underwent three consecutive relegations, ending up in the Football Conference by 2009; they too had been hit by financial problems. Luton had been in the top tier of English Football as recently as the 1991-92 season. They did not reclaim their league status for five seasons.

Swansea City, who climbed from the Fourth Division to the First Division between 1978 and 1981, finished sixth in the 1981-82 season, having led the league several times that season. However, they were relegated a year later and went down again in 1984, suffering a third relegation in four seasons in 1986 after they had almost gone out of business.

Wimbledon, who matched Swansea's record of climbing three divisions in four seasons in 1986, survived in the top flight of English football for 14 years and won the FA Cup in 1988 before being relegated from the Premier League in 2000. They were relegated from Division One four years later, after which they were renamed Milton Keynes Dons following their relocation to Milton Keynes. The renamed club suffered yet another relegation to the league's fourth tier in 2006. They would have gone down the previous year had it not been for a 10-point deduction imposed on financially troubled Wrexham, whose financial situation nearly saw them expelled from the Football League.

In 1998, Manchester City's relegation to Division Two made them the second former winners of a European trophy to be relegated to the third tier of their domestic league (after 1974 UEFA Cup Winners Cup winners Magdeburg in 1991, though that had happened because the league system of the former East Germany had contributed with less clubs in proportion to the unified system after 1990; the English system by contrast remained the same); City won the same trophy in 1970. They faced constant struggles in the league since heavy spending on players in the late 1970s and early 1980s had failed to translate into silverware; they were relegated from the First Division twice during the 1980s, returning after two seasons on both occasions. Similar heavy spending on players in the early 1990s again failed to deliver silverware, and City eventually went down at the end of its fourth season in 1996, after narrowly avoiding relegation in the previous two seasons. A second relegation took them down to Division Two in 1998.

In 2005, Nottingham Forest became the first former winners of the European Cup (which they had won in 1979 and 1980) to be relegated to the third tier of their domestic league. Having also won a league title and four League Cups between 1978 and 1990, they had been relegated at the end of the first Premier League season in 1993, promoted back at the first attempt, gone down again in 1997 and achieved an instant return to the Premier League in 1998, only to be relegated a year later. After three seasons in the third tier (League One), they won promotion back to the second tier (The Championship), staying there up until 2022, when they finally won promotion back to the Premier League.

In 2004, Carlisle United became the first former members of the English top flight to be relegated from the Football League; their solitary season in the top flight was in the Football League First Division in the 1974-75 season, and they in fact led the English league after winning their opening three games of that league campaign. 

In 2006, the 1986 Football League Cup winners Oxford United became the first former winners of a major trophy to be relegated from the Football League. They returned to the league four years later. Other clubs who have fallen from the old First Division to the National League include the aforementioned Luton Town, Grimsby Town and Leyton Orient.

In 2017 and 2018, Sunderland were relegated twice in successive seasons (from the Premier League to the Championship and then to League One), also as a result of financial mismanagement and poor transfer decisions.

2019 brought about two crucial relegations: Ipswich Town to League One after 17 seasons in the Championship following their last relegation from the Premier League, and Notts County falling down to the National League for the first time in 157 years of history – the first FA Cup winner (1894) to fall to non-League level.

In 2022, Oldham Athletic became the first former Premier League club to be relegated to the National League as a result of financial mismanagement. Derby County was also relegated to League One, where they hadn't been since 1986.

"Doing a Leeds"
The term "doing a Leeds" or to "do a Leeds" has since become synonymous with financial mismanagement of a football club with potential dire consequences. It can refer specifically to any club that fails to plan adequately for the financial impact of either failure to qualify for the Champions League, or of not adequately restructuring following relegation from the Premier League to avoid a further drop, or more generally, to the rapid demise in the relative standing of any club.

Managers and chairmen, although sometimes obliged to "chase the dream" (the inevitable precursor of "doing a Leeds"), are often forced to deny they are "doing a Leeds" in the wake of a large investment that some analysts predict cannot be afforded by their club and may overstretch their budget. Similarly, fans may fear their club will "do a Leeds" if its expensively acquired and maintained team is unable to qualify for the Champions League or is relegated from the Premier League, thereby failing to "live the dream".

Conversely, the avoidance of "doing a Leeds" has been invoked by managers to justify selling their best players in order to raise funds to stave off going into administration, which might lead to a relegation-inducing penalty. Failure to invest at the expected "normal" rate in order to maintain a club's league position can be labelled as "doing a Leeds".

The phrase was notably used during the relegation of Newcastle United in 2009, one of the largest clubs to be relegated from the Premier League. Having bought the club, new owner Mike Ashley stated that his investment had in fact saved the club from "doing a Leeds". In spite of this Newcastle suffered relegation at the end of the 2008–09 season, sparking fears both before and after that the club could "do a Leeds" and drop further, into League One, without restructuring. However, the club avoided this and bounced back the following season with automatic first place promotion.

The 2010 announcement of Manchester United's need to refinance their large debt as a bond issue following their purchase by Malcolm Glazer led to questions in the media whether even Manchester United, as the most successful Premier League-era club, could be in danger of "doing a Leeds".

Shelbourne were referred to as the "Irish version of Leeds United" after winning the League of Ireland Premier Division in 2006 but being automatically demoted into the League of Ireland First Division for financial reasons.

The term has been applied to Portsmouth. Despite of their winning in the 2007-08 FA Cup, the club amassed debts which eventually saw them become the first Premier League club to enter administration in the 2009–10 season, leading to relegation in the same season after the subsequent nine-point penalty. Portsmouth were relegated to League One after the 2011–12 season of the Football League Championship, due to a 10-point deduction for entering administration; a near-identical scenario to what occurred to Leeds five years previously. They were again relegated after a 10-point deduction due to failing to pay footballing creditors, this time to League Two, in the 2012–13 season.

Bolton Wanderers are another team guilty of "Doing a Leeds", after enjoying a successful stint in the Premier League under Sam Allardyce, which culminated in qualifying for the UEFA Cup, reaching the last 16 in the latter, which included a draw and a victory against Atlético Madrid, and draws against Bayern Munich and Sporting Lisbon. After Allardyce's departure, the club began a steady decline, with relegation battles being a regular feature. The club then began a rapid decline that ultimately led to relegation on the last day of the 2011–12 season, and after languishing in the second tier for a few seasons, the club announced debts of £172.9m in 2015 and then were relegated to League One in 2016.
They would be relegated from the Championship (tier two) again in 2019 and the club was nearly expelled from the football league due to its financial woes: a new buyer was found but the club was nevertheless deducted 12 points for entering administration (because Bolton finished in the bottom three in the Championship in 2018-19, the points deduction was applied in the 2019–20 season in League One.) In 2019–20 Bolton was relegated to League Two (the fourth tier) for the first time since 1988, although the club achieved promotion back to League One at the first attempt in 2020–21.

A similar phrase, "Doing a Bradford", was coined by former Blackburn Rovers player Simon Garner in 2012, a scenario that he was worried could befall his former club, Bradford City, following their relegation from the Premier League in 2001. They then fell three divisions to League Two, and were not promoted back to League One until 2013. The only other former Premier League clubs to have fallen to League Two are Swindon Town (in 2006 and then 2011, though they immediately gained promotion to League One on both occasions), Portsmouth, Blackpool, Coventry City, Oldham Athletic and Bolton Wanderers.

Ralf Rangnick, sporting director of German Bundesliga club RB Leipzig, compared the mismanagement of TSV 1860 Munich to that of Leeds United, drawing direct parallels between the ownership and resulting fan dissatisfaction at both clubs. The two clubs in fact met in a Champions League fixture in 2000, before both experiencing relegation from their respective top flight leagues in the following seasons.

"Leeds Days" 
The commonly-used phrase in Korean "리즈시절"  which literally translates as "Leeds Days" in English shares an origin with the concept of "doing a Leeds". It is used by Koreans to mean the prime of their lives, usually outside of a football context, and often by women referring to when they were younger and felt more attractive. This saying started to proliferate in online football fans forums centred on ex-Leeds striker Alan Smith as a comeback to Manchester United fans who did not think he was good enough.

"Cruzeirar" 
In Brazilian football, "Cruzeirar" (Doing a Cruzeiro) has the same meaning of "doing a Leeds", but refers to the Cruzeiro's dramatic decline, from being national champions in 2013 and 2014 to barely escaping relegation to Série C in 2020, due to serious financial mismanagement issues.

See also
 History of Leeds United F.C.
 List of Leeds United F.C. seasons
 Premier League–Football League gulf

References

British English idioms
Debt
Football in England
Leeds United F.C.
Metaphors referring to sport
2002–03 FA Premier League
2003–04 FA Premier League